For the notion in quantum mechanics, see scattering matrix.

In multivariate statistics and probability theory, the scatter matrix is a statistic that is used to make estimates of the covariance matrix, for instance of the multivariate normal distribution.

Definition
Given n samples of m-dimensional data, represented as the m-by-n matrix, the sample mean is

The scatter matrix is the m-by-m positive semi-definite matrix

where  denotes matrix transpose, and multiplication is with regards to the outer product. The scatter matrix may be expressed more succinctly as

where  is the n-by-n centering matrix.

Application
The maximum likelihood estimate, given n samples, for the covariance matrix of a multivariate normal distribution can be expressed as the normalized scatter matrix

See also
 Estimation of covariance matrices
 Sample covariance matrix
 Wishart distribution
 Outer product—or X⊗X is the outer product of X with itself.
 Gram matrix

References 

Covariance and correlation
Matrices